Spain competed at the 2014 Winter Olympics in Sochi, Russia, from 7 to 23 February 2014. The 20 athlete team was officially announced on 21 January 2014.

Alpine skiing 

According to the quota allocation released on 30 December 2013, Spain had seven athletes in qualification position. The final team was announced on 21 January 2014.

Biathlon 

Spain qualified 1 men and 1 women.

Cross-country skiing 

According to the quota allocation released on 30 December 2013, Spain had three athletes in qualification position. The final team was announced on 21 January 2014.  

Distance

Sprint

Figure skating 

Spain achieved the following quota places:
The team consists of the 2013 World Figure Skating Championships bronze medalist Javier Fernández among others

Freestyle skiing 

According to the quota allocation released on 30 December 2013, Spain had one athlete in qualification position. The final team was announced on 21 January 2014.

Skeleton 

Spain had one athlete in qualification positions.

Snowboarding 

According to the quota allocation released on 30 December 2013, Spain had four athlete in qualification position. The final team was announced on 21 January 2014.  

Halfpipe

Qualification Legend: QF – Qualify directly to final; QS – Qualify to semifinal

Snowboard cross

Qualification legend: FA – Qualify to medal round; FB – Qualify to consolation round

References

External links 
Spain at the 2014 Winter Olympics

Nations at the 2014 Winter Olympics
2014
Winter Olympics